is a Japanese word meaning "futility", "uselessness", or "wastefulness", and is a key concept in lean process thinking such as in the Toyota Production System (TPS), denoting one of three types of deviation from optimal allocation of resources. The other types are known by the Japanese terms mura ("unevenness") and muri ("overload"). Waste in this context refers to the wasting of time or resources rather than wasteful by-products and should not be confused with Waste reduction.

From an end-customer's point of view, value-added work is any activity that produces goods or provides a service for which a customer is willing to pay; muda is any constraint or impediment that causes waste to occur.

There are two types of muda:

 Muda Type I: non value-adding, but necessary for end-customers. These are usually harder to eliminate because while classified as non-value adding, they may still be necessary.
 Muda Type II: non value-adding and unnecessary for end-customers. These contribute to waste, incur hidden costs and should be eliminated.

Toyota's (Ohno's) Seven Forms of Waste
One of the key steps in lean process and TPS is to identify which activities add value and which do not, then to progressively work to improve or eliminate them.

Taiichi Ohno, "father" of the Toyota Production System, originally identified seven forms of muda or waste:

A mnemonic may be useful for remembering the categories of waste, such as TIM WOOD or TIM WOODS.

Transportation
Every time a product is touched or moved unnecessarily there is a risk that it could be damaged, lost, delayed, etc. as well as being a cost for no added value. Transportation does not add value to the product, i.e. is not a transformation for which the consumer is willing to pay.

Inventory
Whether in the form of raw materials, work-in-progress (WIP), or finished goods, represents a capital outlay that cannot yet produce an income. The longer a product sits in one of these states, the more it contributes to waste. The smooth, continuous flow of work through each process ensures excess amounts of inventory are minimized.

Motion
In contrast to transportation, which refers to damage and transaction costs associated with moving the product, motion refers to the damage and costs inflicted on what creates the product. This can include wear and tear for equipment, repetitive strain injuries for workers or unnecessary downtime.

Waiting
Whenever the product is not in transportation or being processed, it is waiting (typically in a queue). In traditional processes, a large part of an individual product's life is spent waiting to be worked on.

Overproduction
Making more of a product than is required results in several forms of waste, typically caused by production in large batches. The customer's needs often change over the time it takes to produce a larger batch. Over-production has been described as the worst kind of waste.

Over processing
Doing more to a product than is required by the end-customer results in it taking longer and costing more to produce. This also includes using components that are more precise, complex, expensive or higher quality than absolutely required.

Defects
Having to discard or rework a product due to earlier defective work or components results in additional cost and delays.

Unused skills
Organizations often under-utilize the skills their workers have or permit workers to operate in silos so that knowledge is not shared. This was added to the original seven forms of waste, as resolving this waste is a key enabler to resolving the others.

Alternative forms of waste
The eight forms of waste were developed for Toyota specific processes.

Other companies and individuals have elucidated or identified other forms of waste. Some examples follow:

Canon's nine wastes
 Work-in-process waste: e.g., stocking items not immediately needed 
 Defect waste: producing defective products 
 Equipment waste: idle or broken machinery; empty facilities; taking too long for setup 
 Investment or expense waste: overuse of resources for required output 
 Indirect labor waste: excess personnel due to unskillful use of indirect labor 
 Human resources or talent waste: employing people whose talents exceed job requirements, when the job can be mechanized or assigned to less skilled people 
 Operations or motion waste: Not working according to the best standards. 
 Planning or product design waste: Implementing processes or producing products with more functionality than necessary. 
 Start-up waste: The waste or inefficiency in the ramp-up or stabilization of the production of a new product.

Confusion 

General uncertainty about the right thing to do, or absence of documented procedures and operating statements.

Self-doubt
Writer Jim Womack described "thinking you can't" as the worst form of waste, quoting Henry Ford's aphorism:

Implementation
Shigeo Shingo divides process related activity into Process and Operation. He distinguishes "Process", the course of material that is transformed into product, from "Operation" which are the actions performed on the material by workers and machines. This distinction is not generally recognized because most people would view the "Operations" performed on the raw materials of a product by workers and machines as the "Process" by which those raw materials are transformed into the final product. Shingo breaks down the process into four phenomena, Transportation, Inspection, Processing and Delay. He makes this distinction because value is only added during the processing steps in the process not by the transportation, inspection and delay steps. He states that whereas many see Process and Operations in parallel he sees them at right angles (orthogonal) (see Value Stream Mapping). This starkly throws most of the operations into the waste category.

Many of the TPS/Lean techniques work in a similar way. By planning to reduce manpower, or reduce change-over times, or reduce campaign lengths, or reduce lot sizes, the question of waste comes immediately into focus upon those elements that prevent the plan being implemented. Often it is in the operations' area rather than the process area that muda can be eliminated and remove the blockage to the plan. Tools of many types and methodologies can then be employed on these wastes to reduce or eliminate them.

The plan is therefore to build a fast, flexible process where the immediate impact is to reduce waste and therefore costs. By ratcheting the process towards this aim with focused muda reduction to achieve each step, the improvements are 'locked in' and become required for the process to function. Without this intent to build a fast, flexible process there is a significant danger that any improvements achieved will not be sustained because they are just desirable and can slip back towards old behaviours without the process stopping.

See also
 Lean manufacturing
 Lean software development
 Agile software development
 Total quality management
 Theory of Constraints

References

External links
 "The 7 Manufacturing Wastes"
 "8 Wastes of Lean Manufacturing"

Japanese business terms
Lean manufacturing